"Tribulations" is a 2005 song by LCD Soundsystem. It is the seventh single from the band's eponymous debut album. The single's cover was designed by Michael Vadino for DFA Design.

Use in popular culture
The song is featured  in the opening theme to the Sound Opinions radio show, the 2005 video game Project Gotham Racing 3, the 2006 video game Driver: Parallel Lines, and The Office episode "Night Out". It is additionally a playable song in Dance Dance Revolution: Hottest Party 2.

Music video
The video for "Tribulations" was first aired in August 2005. It was directed by Dougal Wilson and produced by Colonel Blimp. It features James Murphy walking around through various screens, sometimes walking out of a screen into the real setting just to walk back into the next screen.

Track listing

CDS
 "Tribulations" (Edit) – 3:52
 "Tribulations" (Tiga's Out of the Trance Closet Mix) – 6:02

7"
A. "Tribulations" (Edit)
B. "Tribulations" (Shallow Version)

12"
 "Tribulations" (Edit)
 "Tribulations" (Tiga's Out of the Trance Closet Mix)
 "Tribulations" (Lindstrom Mix)

References

LCD Soundsystem songs
2005 singles
2005 songs
Songs written by James Murphy (electronic musician)